Charles Derennes (4 August 1882 – 27 April 1930) was a French novelist, essayist and poet, the winner of the Prix Femina in 1924.

Biography 
Derennes was born in Charente, the son of Gustave, a professor of history, and Marthe Cassan, the daughter of a baker. Charles spent his childhood in Villeneuve-sur-Lot. In 1892, he entered the lycee of Talence in the suburbs of Bordeaux. There he met the poet Émile Despax from Dax, and Marcel Gounouilhou, future director of the daily La Petite Gironde with whom he would collaborate.

After receiving his baccalaureate in 1899, he went to Paris to prepare the entrance examination to the École Normale Supérieure at Lycée Henri-IV and Lycée Louis-le-Grand from which he was sent back. He attended classes at the Sorbonne, obtained a bachelor's degree in letters in 1903, and frequented literary salons such as that of Anna de Noailles and the poetry evenings of the magazine La Plume at the Caveau du Soleil d'Or.

On May 11, 1909, in Paris he married Rosita Finaly, one of the daughters of Hugo Finaly, founder of the Banque de Paris et des Pays-Bas, which ended in divorce on January 19, 1911. During the Great War, he was a military nurse in southwestern France. He married a second time in Paris on March 23, 1916, with  Christiane. In 1917, Derennes settled temporarily in the Landes. From 1905, he was part of the group of writers, including Rosny jeune, Paul Margueritte, and Maxime Leroy, which, at the beginning of the 20th century, made Hossegor known and where he stayed regularly until the early 1920s.
  
On December 10, 1924, he obtained the Prix Femina for Émile et les autres, third volume of the series Bestiaire sentimental. Appointed a knight of the Legion of Honour on January 4, 1925, he died on April 27, 1930, and was buried in Villeneuve-sur-Lot.

Literary work 
Derennes started in the world of letters at a young age, but success came gradually. He published more than fifty books in the twenty-five years of his career, and collaborated at the same time in numerous newspapers and magazines. Critics often praised his work

He is known for his collections of poems: L'Enivrante Angoisse, La Tempête, La Chanson des Deux Jeunes Filles or Perséphone. He also is the author of a volume of Occitan poems, Romivatge, a language he had practiced since his youth.

After L'Amour fessé and Le Peuple du pôle, he published "Parisian" before the war and novels that originally appeared in the weekly La Vie Parisienne: Les Caprices de Nouche, Le Béguin des Muses, Le Miroir des pécheresses, Nique et ses cousines. Subsequently, he published other novels,  among which are La Nuit d'été, Cassinou va-t-en guerre, La Petite Faunesse, Le Renard bleu, Mon Gosse..., Ouily et Bibi, Amours basques, Le Pauvre et son chien.

Le Bestiaire sentimental, which was a popular favorite with the public, comprises three volumes: Vie de Grillon, La Chauve-Souris and Émile et les autres. In these stories, he gave tender attention to animals that had populated his universe since childhood (crickets, bats, cats, frogs).

Works

Poems 
1904: L'Énivrante angoisse, Librairie Paul Ollendorff
1906: La Tempête, Ollendorff
1918: La Chanson des deux Jeunes Filles, À la Belle Édition
1920: Perséphone, Garnier
1921: Le Livre d'Annie, François Bernouard
1923: La Fontaine Jouvence, Garnier
1924: La Princesse, "Les Amis d'Edouard"
1924: Romivatge, Samatan, Editorial Occitan, "Amics del Libre Occitan", (poems in Occitan language).
1925: Premières poésies, Albert Messein, (with L'Énivrante angoisse and La Tempête).

Essays and novels 
1906: L'Amour fessé, Mercure de France, novel
1907: Le Peuple du Pôle, Mercure de France, novel (translated into English by Brian Stableford as The People of the Pole, Black Coat Press, 2008   )
1907: La Vie et la Mort de M. de Tournèves, Éditions Grasset, novel
1908: La Guenille, Louis-Michaud, novel
1909: Les Caprices de Nouche, Éditions de la Vie Parisienne, novel
1912: Le Béguin des Muses, Éditions de la Vie Parisienne, novel
1912: Le Miroir des Pécheresses, Louis-Michaud, novel
1913: Les Enfants sages, Louis-Michaud, novel
1914: Nique et ses Cousines, Louis-Michaud, novel
1914: La Nuit d'été, L'Édition, novel
1917: Cassinou va-t-en guerre, L'Édition française illustrée, novel
1918: Leur tout petit cœur, La Renaissance du Livre, novel
1918: Le Pèlerin de Gascogne, L'Édition française illustrée, tales and narrations
1918: La Petite Faunesse, L'Édition, novel
1919: Les Conquérants d'idoles, L'Édition française illustrée (illustrations by Charles Genty), then Georges-Crès, novel
1919: Les Bains dans le Pactole, Albin Michel, novel
1920: L'Aventure de Roland Ombreval, poète – 1830, Société anonyme d'édition et de librairie, novel 
1920: Vie de Grillon, Albin Michel, essay
1921: Le Renard bleu, Albin Michel, novel
1921: Le Beau Max, Ferenczi, novel
1922: La Chauve-Souris, Albin Michel, essay
1923: Le Pou et l'Agneau, Ferenczi, novel
1923: Mon Gosse..., Baudinière, novel
1924: Bellurot, Éditions du Monde moderne, novel
1924: Émile et les autres, Albin Michel, essay
1925: L'Enfant dans l'herbe, Ferenczi, novel
1925: Ouily et Bibi, Albert Messein, novel
1925: Le Mirage sentimental, Éditions de la Nouvelle Revue critique, (with La Vie et la Mort de M. de Tournèves and L'Aventure de Roland Ombreval, poète).
1925: Gaby, mon amour, Albin Michel, novel (reprint of La Nuit d'été)
1925: Les Petites alliances, Albin Michel, novel
1926: La Fortune et le Jeu. Le jeu, les jeux et l'activité humaine, Ed. , essay
1926: Mouti, chat de Paris, Albin Michel, novel
1927: Amours et Crimes, Éditions de France, historical essay
1927: Mouti, fils de Mouti, Éditions de la Nouvelle Revue critique, novel
1927: Les Cocus célèbres, Éditions de France, historical essay
1928:  Amours basques, Nouvelle Société d'Édition, novel
1928: La Mort du Prince impérial, Hachette, historical essay
1928: Les Noces sur la banquise, Éditions de la Nouvelle Revue critique, novel
1930: Le Pauvre et son chien, La Renaissance du Livre, novel
1930: Dieu, les Bêtes et Nous. Les Porte-Bonheur, Éditions des Portiques, essay

Works written in collaboration 
1914: La Grande Anthologie, la seule qui ne publie que de l'inédit, Louis-Michaud, s. d., Collections of literary pastiches written in particular in collaboration with Pierre Benoit and Charles Perrot
1921: La Pléiade, Librairie de France, collection of poems by comtesse de Noailles, Pierre Camo, Charles Derennes, Joachim Gasquet, Xavier de Magallon, Fernand Mazade, Paul Valéry
1921: Journal des Goncours. Mémoires de la vie littéraire par un groupe d'indiscrets (partie inédite). Année 1896, La Renaissance du Livre, s. d., literary pastiche attributed to Pierre Benoit, to which he collaborated closely with other authors such as Léon Deffoux
1924: Un train entre en gare, Éditions du Siècle, novel signed Henri Seguin, a literary mystification to which Pierre Benoit, Tristan Derème and other authors also collaborated
1925: Le Jocond, Éditions du Siècle, another novel signed Henri Seguin, mystification by the same
1927: La Promenade Euskadienne. Notes et Souvenirs du Pays basque, 1892-1927, in Le Pays basque, by Charles Derennes, François de Vaux de Foletier, Hector Talvart, foreword by Thierry Sandre, La Rochelle, Éditions d'art Raymond Bergevin
1927: Le Limousin, le Quercy et le Périgord, in Le Visage de la France [collective], Éditions des Horizons de France, fasc. 14.
1928: Le Nouveau Livre de la Pléiade, Librairie de France, F. Sant'Andrea, collection of poems by Joachim Gasquet, Comtesse de Noailles, Pierre Camo, Charles Derennes, Xavier de Magallon, Fernand Mazade, Paul Valéry
1928: La dompteuse, in La Femme, selon [collective], Baudinière
1930: Gens et Bêtes de Gascogne, in Sud-Ouest. Béarn, Pays basque, Côte d'Argent, Gascogne, by Xavier de Cardaillac, Charles Derennes, François Duhourcau, Pierre Frondaie, Étienne Huyard, Francis Jammes, Hervé Lauwick, Maxime Leroy, François Mauriac, Joseph de Pesquidoux, J. H. Rosny Jeune, drawings by P.-G. Rigaud, Léon Fauret, Suzanne Labatut, Hossegor, Librairie D. Chabas

Bibliography 
 Raoul Davray, Henry Rigal, Anthologie des Poètes du Midi, Ollendorff, 1908, .
 Gabriel Boissy, Dominique Folacci, L'amour dans la poésie française. Essai suivi d'un recueil sur les plus beaux poèmes d'amour, Fayard, s. d. [1910], . 
 Adolphe Van Bever, Les Poètes du Terroir, Delagrave, 1920, t. 2, . 
 Henri Martineau, "Charles Derennes, poète", Le Divan, n°67, September–October 1922.
 Pierre Lièvre, "Les Poètes du Divan. Anthologie", Le Divan, n°92, September–October 1923, .
 Robert de La Vaissière, Anthologie poétique du XXe siècle, Crès, t. 1, 1923, . 
 Adolphe Van Bever, Paul Léautaud, Poètes d'Aujourd'hui, Mercure de France, 1927, t. 1, .
 Maurice-Pierre Boyé, "Poètes : Charles Derennes", La Muse française, n°3, 15 July 1935, 
 Louis Ducla, Trois Grands Poètes d'Aquitaine, Carcassonne, Éditions du Domaine, 1938, 
 Jean-Louis Lambert, Charles Derennes (1882-1930). Un écrivain à Hossegor et dans les Landes. L'homme et l'œuvre, Hossegor, Éditions "Lac et lande", 2004. 
 Gérard Maignan, Ils ont fait Hossegor, Biarritz, Atlantica, 2006, .
 Charles Picot, "Charles Derennes", Revue de l'Agenais, n°4, October–December 2006,  and n°1, January–March 2007,

References

External links 
 Charles Derennes on "Tristan Derème"
 À la découverte de Charles Derennes on "Les amis de la musique française"
 Charles Derennes on "Les amis de la musique française"
 Charles Derennes et le « Peuple du Pôle » on "Le chasseur de chimères"

20th-century French poets
20th-century French novelists
20th-century French essayists
French literary critics
French male short story writers
French short story writers
French science fiction writers
Prix Femina winners
Chevaliers of the Légion d'honneur
1882 births
People from Villeneuve-sur-Lot
1930 deaths
20th-century French male writers
French male non-fiction writers